Huasacocha (possibly from Quechua wasa the human back or the back of an animal, qucha lake, "back lake") is a mountain at a small lake of the same name in the Vilcanota mountain range in the Andes of Peru, about  high. It lies in the Cusco Region, Canchis Province, Pitumarca District, and in the Quispicanchi Province, in the districts Cusipata and Ocongate. Huasacocha is situated south-west of the mountain Sorimani and north of the mountain Jatunrritioc. There are two small lakes south-east of the mountain named Quiullacocha ("gull lake") and Surini.

The river Pucamayo ("red river") originates at the lake. It flows to the west as a right tributary of the Vilcanota River.

References

Mountains of Peru
Mountains of Cusco Region
Lakes of Peru
Lakes of Cusco Region